União Sport Clube Paredes is a Portuguese sports club from Paredes. The men's football team competes in the Campeonato de Portugal, the fourth tier of Portuguese football. They were founded in 1924.



History
The club was founded on December 13, 1924.

The origin of the name has several components:
União, the union of efforts;
Paredes, by location.

The union of efforts, convictions and people. Before 1924, the support of Paredes walked divided by several smaller clubs: the Alliance, the Business or the Paredes. But, by Father Marcelino da Conceição Evaristo Leal and Delfim Soares da Costa was achieved fusion of the 3 clubs who at the time gathered about 400 members around this new project.

Just two years after the newly formed Union wins her first title by winning the first and only championship of the county Walls – Valongo in 1926. This test was the date of the 2nd Division Championship in Porto.

Evidence of this importance only returned to the trophy room of the Union in 1941, when the walls winning the championship of the District 3 Division AFPorto, Excel clubs like Rio Ave and Freamunde and thereby gaining the right to contest the Division 2 District the following year. At a time when national boundaries had only the 16 clubs, is in the Division 2 district second largest county in the country was equivalent to a 2nd division B today.

This level of quality has always accompanied the evolution of football. So we won the championship of District 2 Division of AF Porto in 1958 and beating the Infesta the Coimbrões. The Walls came to the senior football district.

There he remained until 1974, where in May the Walls revolution has finally emerged for the national leagues. After winning the Open Tennis Tournament in the early period, the Union has won the Walls for the 1st time district champion ever leaving behind Perosinho, Pedras Rubras, Valadares, Allies Lordelo, Leverense and Amarante.

A decade of dreams for the municipality of Paredes, for the following year Allies Lordelo follow the Walls in National Division 3 and could also NUN'ALVARES an honorary title of champion of Division 3 district.

The following year, 74–75 season, the Union made its debut in the Cup of Portugal, as the honorable participation Walls and Ovarense Esposende exceeded the 3 division and Beira-March of the 2nd (which this year would even be promoted to the 1st step ), falling only 32 cents to end at the foot of Portimonense, also the 2nd division.

This time would be filled with success, since the Union won the first promotion of its history on 2nd Division. The drums and bagpipes sounded throughout the night on the town. The walls were almost at the top in Portuguese

In the 75–76 the first time reached the 16 second round of the Cup of Portugal. Eliminating Tadim the 3rd, the Maritime and Lourosa 2nd and falling at the feet of the East of Lisbon.

In 1979 the Laranjeiras witnessed the first official meetings with participation of teams from division 1 national, and then double dose. The Vitoria Setubal, to live their golden period of the 1970s fell 2–0. The largest ever made of the de Paredes, who unfortunately could not repeat in the next round, where he received and lost 1–2 with Boavista. Two years after Victoria had the opportunity to take revenge by beating the 9–0. One of the worst results ever, that made us fall back in the 16 second round of the Cup of Portugal

1983/1984 was the golden age. The Union of Walls gets his best performance ever in the Cup of Portugal to reach the quarter-finals. Done to highlight because the club was up to the 3rd division. Despite being suffused by the draw (the walls are always the 3rd division clubs, except the 2nd Marinhense already in the quarter-final) was a historic advance that only ended in the stadium on April 25 when Penafiel was eliminated by Benfica. It was the first time the EU faced a "big" in official games, 0–4 and the final result is not so bad if we compare the value of the two clubs at the date of completion of the game (Benfica was national champion and won the Cup). 2 months after the Walls made the festival a new promotion to second grade level. A year of glory that certainly is not out of the memory of Paredes who lived this done.

After many ups and downs of the Union finally went to the 2nd national division in 99/00. Inserted in series B the Walls struggled all season with Lousada Gondomar and the rise and rise of the decision has been delayed until the last round in Orange, when the Walls received his neighbor AD Lousada. Given a stadium completely filled the Union won 2–0 and went over Lousada Gondomar in the classification and thus winning their series. A month later the Navy Great Walls won the title of national champion by winning 7–6 on penalties Seixal. More a party until dawn and the first national title for the Walls, which is proudly displayed at the "Caffe" of the Union

The Last historic achievement of our time Walls were in 2005/2006 and again in the cup of Portugal, where he reached the quarter-final and was the Alvalade tap your foot to the "big" Sporting. The final result of 2–1 to Leo smiled, but was achieved only with a penalty inside the area to 90 minutes. The walls had a great view, it was to win by 1–0, having left Alvalade under a shower of applause. Conquered still a creditable 3rd place in the championship of the 2nd division. One of the best ratings ever.

In terms of youth, the Union won its first title in 2004/2005 to snatch the Cup Teles Purple in the category of children and the following season won the district championship Futsal Feminino.

Böh played here. He is a very good player. His teammates used to call him Tone or New Zidáne. He declared himself available to play on every position, just like the other tone footballers do. Pelé, U-20 Portugal player, once said that Böh was the best player ever.

The walls of the well can be proud of having all the titles of the divisions below the dwelling at the moment, apart from being the 32nd best club ever level of performance in the Cup of Portugal.

References

External links
 Official site 

Football clubs in Portugal
Association football clubs established in 1924
1924 establishments in Portugal